Events in the year 1724 in Spain.

Incumbents
King: Philip V until  his abdication on January 15, Louis I until his death on August 31, and Philip V again.

Deaths
August 31 - Louis I of Spain (b. 1707)

References

 
1720s in Spain